Little Joe, the Wrangler is a 1942 American Western film directed by Lewis D. Collins and written by Sherman L. Lowe and Elizabeth Beecher. The film stars Johnny Mack Brown, Tex Ritter, Fuzzy Knight, Jennifer Holt, Florine McKinney and James Craven. The film was released on November 13, 1942, by Universal Pictures.

Plot

Cast         
Johnny Mack Brown as Neal Wallace
Tex Ritter as Sheriff Bob Brewster
Fuzzy Knight as Little Joe Smith
Jennifer Holt as Janet Hammond
Florine McKinney as Mary Brewster
James Craven as Lloyd Chapin
Wally Wales as Ben Travis
Glenn Strange as Jeff Corey
Jimmy Wakely as Jimmy Wakely 
Johnny Bond as Johnny
Scotty Harrel as Scotty

References

External links
 

1942 films
American Western (genre) films
1942 Western (genre) films
Universal Pictures films
Films directed by Lewis D. Collins
American black-and-white films
1940s English-language films
1940s American films